'''''''The Uganda Film Festival Award for Best Actress in a Television Drama''' is an award presented annually by Uganda Communications Commission (UCC) to a female actor (actress) for their outstanding acting in a television drama series in Uganda at the Uganda Film Festival Awards

Winners and nominees
The table shows the winners and nominees for the Best Actress in a Television Drama award.

Multiple wins and nominations
No actress has received multiple wins for this category.

Some televisions series have received multiple nominations in this category as seen below.

References

Ugandan television awards
Television awards for Best Actress